Marijn Sterk (born 11 July 1987 in The Hague) is a Dutch footballer who plays as a left-back for Always Forward Hoorn.

Sterk played in the youth of VCS from The Hague, until he was scouted by Ajax at age 14. In Ajax he went through the youth department until Jong Ajax. Sterk played there until 2008, where he decided to make a transfer to FC Volendam. His professional debut followed on 27 September 2008, in a match against PSV Eindhoven.

References

1987 births
Living people
Dutch footballers
FC Volendam players
FC Emmen players
Eerste Divisie players
Footballers from The Hague
Association football fullbacks
OFC Oostzaan players